Rajasree (Rajasree Thota Panchajanyam, Kusuma Kumari), also known as Rajasri or Rajashri, is an Indian actress active from 1956 to 1979. She is particularly famous for her portrayal as a princess in several folklore Telugu movies opposite N. T. Rama Rao and Tadepalli Lakshmi Kanta Rao and for acting alongside Ravichandran in the Tamil comedy films Neeyum Naanum, Kadhalikka Neram Illai and Delhi Mappilai. Notable among Rajasris roles in non-folklore social films in Tamil are as Nimmi in the Tamil hit comedy film Kaadhalikka Neramillai, remade as Preminchi Choodu in Telugu, as movie star Bhama in Tamil film Bama Vijayam. She was credited as Gracy in the Malayalam movies she starred in her career since her debut film Bharya (1962), directed by Kunchako. Rajasree went on to do 200 films spread across the languages – Telugu, Tamil, Kannada, Malayalam (as Gracy) and Hindi from beginning of 1956 to 1979.

Film industry
Rajsree first appeared as a child artiste in the Tamil film Naga Devadhai in 1956. She worked as child artiste in films like Bhaktha Ambarisha (1959) and Mangalyam (1960) in Telugu, Aasha Sundari (1960) in Kannada, Petraval Kanda Peruvazhvu (1960) and Baktha Sabari (1960) in Tamil. She debuted as a young heroin in Telugu film Nitya Kalyanam Paccha Thoranam in 1960 opposite another debutante Hero Ramakrishna (Telugu actor). She acted as the supporting young heroine with the Malayalam film Bharya (1962). Her character was named Gracy. With the success of her debut Malayalam film, Rajsree was always credited throughout her Malayalam film career as Gracy. Some of her famous Malayalam movies include Kadalamma (1963), Rebecca (1963), Pazhassi Raja (1964) and Shakuntala (1965). However, she was cast only as supporting and second lead actress in Tamil films like Sengamala Theevu (1962), Nichaya Thaamboolam (1962), Thendral Veesum (1962), Kalai Arasi (1963), Yarukku Sondham (1963) and Kattu Maina (1963) in the period 1962 to 1963. Her portrayal as the courtesean Madhavi in the film Poompuhar brought her new recognition as supporting actress in 1964. It was the film Kadhalikka Neram Illai in 1964, which made her a household name as the main lead heroine. She started receiving more Tamil films from 1964 onward.

However, she continued to be very selective as far as her choice of doing Malayalam movies was concerned. Her notable films in Malayalam as the lead heroine include Jail (1966), Kadamattathachan (1966), Anarkali (1966), Udhyogastha (1967), Karutha Rathrikal (1967), Kadal (1968), Dial 2244 (1968), Urangatha Sundary (1969), Sree Guruvayoorappan (1972), Sreemurukan and Devi Kanyaakumaari (1974). She did about 30 movies in Malayalam. Her last Malayalam film was Vishwaroopam (1978).

It was the Tamil comic classic, Kaadhalikka Neramillai, that catapulted Rajasree to national fame. She quoted in an interview "When I got a call from such a big banner as Chitralaya asking me to be present at the studio the next morning, I couldn't believe my ears. Many artistes had been considered for the role, I had heard. The song, "Anubavam Pudhumai", was the sequence that was shot first. They liked it and I did the film,". Rajasree went on to play the same role in Telugu with Akkini Nageswara Rao and in Hindi with Shashi Kapoor — she was the only one to repeat the role in the remakes. She quoted in interview "I remember Nagesh pulling my leg often shouting out "Dhigilazhagi" whenever I was on the sets,". Hence both during the shooting of Bama Vijayam and every time she met actor Nagesh, he would always call her as Dhiglazhagi as in the film, a thief refers to her by that name.

It was decided by Sridhar to remake Kadhallikaa Neram Illai in Hindi as Pyar Kiye Jaa and he retained only Rajasree from the original. Her debut Hindi film was a major box office hit in 1966. This led to her receiving films in Hindi as well. However none of her 4 films in Hindi became a hit except for her debut Hindi film.

She made her heroine debut in Telugu films with Nitya Kalyanam Paccha Thoranam in 1960 opposite Hero Ramakrishna (Telugu actor) and Constable Kuthuru (1962) opposite Kanta Rao, but previously she had been already introduced as a child artist in Nagula Chavithi (1956). She was cast as the heroine of N. T. Rama Rao in films like Aggi Barata (1966), Pidugu Ramudu (1966), Aggi Veerudu (1969) and Chitti Chellelu (1969). Her pairing opposite actor Kanta Rao was a box office success. The pair Rajasree-Kanta Rao worked in Pakkalo Ballem (1965), Bangaru Timmaraju (1964), Saptaswaralu (1969), Pratigyna Palana (1966), Vijaya Simha (1965), Aggidora (1967), Bhoolokamlo Yamolokam (1966), Devudichchina Bharta (1968), Veera Pooja (1968), Ranabheri (1968), Aggimeeda Guggilam (1968), Oke Kutumbham (1970), Merupu Veerudu (1970), Maa Manchi Akkayya (1970), Prema Jeevulu, Bhale Ettu Chivaraku Chittu (1970) and Raite Raju (1970). They worked in another 10 movies where they were not paired opposite each other. She did about 76 films in Telugu. Her last film in Telugu was Andame Anandham (1977).

Her debut film in Kannada was Kantheredu Nodu (1961). The Kannada film Thejaswini, produced by M. Pandaribai, made Rajasree a popular in the Kannada film circle. She played second lead supporting roles in Kannada films like Swarna Gowri, Rathna Manjari, Karuneye Kutumbada Kannu and Chandra Kumara. She regularly starred in mythological period films like Santha Thukaram (1963), Shivarathri Mahathme and Shivagange Mahathme with either Rajkumar or Udaykumar or both. After achieving success in Tamil with Kadhalikka Neram Illai, she decided to do only lead heroine roles even in Kannada from 1964. Her Kannada films as lead heroine include Chandavalliya Thota, Satya Harishchandra (1965), Bala Nagamma (1966), Bhale Basava, Mr. Rajkumar (1970), Jwala Mohini, CID 72 and C.I.D. Rajanna. She was part of the cast in 14 films in Kannada with Rajkumar in the lead role. She did 30 films in Kannada with her last movie being Devadhasi (1978).

She went on to do comedy films as the lead heroine in Tamil to capitalize on her comic abilities like Bama Vijayam (1967), Anubavi Raja Anubavi (1967), Anubavam Pudhumai (1967), Neeyum Naanum (1968) and Delhi Mapillai (1968). These films have developed classic cult status over the years. She then went on to get the second lead heroine roles in films with M. G. Ramachandran in the lead, like Thaikku Thalaimagan (1967), Kudiyirundha Koyil (1968), Adimai Penn (1969), Pattikaattu Ponnaiya (1973), Netru Indru Naalai (1974) and Naalai Namadhe (1975). Her other notable films in Tamil include Kallum Kaniyagum, suspense thriller Selva Magal (1967), Siritha Mugam (1968), Patham Pasali (1970), Poi Sollathae (1971), Pattondru Ketten (1971), Yanai Valartha Vanampadi Magan, Amudha (1975) and Veeduvarai Uravu (1976). Her last film in Tamil was Iravu 12 Mani (1978). She did more than sixty films in Tamil.

Personal life
Rajasree hails from a village in Eluru, Andhra Pradesh. She was born with a sister and her father was a railway station master. Rajasree was ten years old when she came to Chennai. She married Thota Panchajanyam in Hyderabad at 1977. Rajasree's husband died within few years after her marriage, when her child was four years old.

Awards
Rajasree was honoured with the MGR Award in 2004.

Tamil Nadu State Government Awards
Kalaimamani, 2012 for her contribution to Tamil Cinema

Partial filmography 
In order of languages in which she acted the most to fewest films.

This list is incomplete; you can help by expanding it.

Telugu

 Andame Anandham (1977)
 Daana Veera Soora Karna (1977)
 Manushulanta Okkate (1976)
 Sri Ramanjaneya Yuddham (1975)
 Alluri Seetarama Raju (1974)
 Intinti Katha (1974)
 Panjaramlo Pasipapa (1973)
 Atthanu Diddina Kodalu (1972)
 Prema Jeevulu (1971)
 Pattindhalla Bangaaram (1971)
 Adavi Veerulu (1971)
 Vikramarka Vijayam (1971)
 Anuradha (1971)
 Bangaru Kutumbam (1971)
 Chitti Chellelu (1970)
 Evarini Nammali (1970)
 Jhanmabhoomi (1970)
 Okka Kutumbham (1970)
 Raithe Raju (1970)
 Lakshmi Kataksham (1970)
 Maa Manchi Akkayya (1970)
 Bale Etthu Chivariki Chitthu (1970)
 Merupu Veerudu (1970)
 Ukkupidugu (1969)
 Gopaludu Bhoopaludu (1969)
 Sattekalapu Satteya (1969)
 Sabash Satyam (1969)
 Takkari Donga Chankkani Chukka (1969)
 Aggi Veerudu (1969)
 Ukku Pidugu (1969)
 Saptaswaralu (1969)
 Gandara Gandadu (1969)
 Govula Gopanna (1968)
 Aggi Meeda Guggilam (1968)
 Rajayogam (1968)
 Ranabheri (1968)
 Devudichhina Bhartha (1968)
 Bhale Kodallu (1968)
 Evaru Monagaadu (1968)
 Rahasyam (1967)
 Aggidora (1967)
 Sthree Janma (1967)
 Kambojaraju Katha (1967)
 Sri Sri Sri Maryada Ramanna (1967)
 Raktha Sindhooram (1967)
 Satyame Jayam (1967)
 Veera Pooja (1967)
 Aggi Barata (1966)
 Loguttu Perumallakeruka (1966)
 Bhimanjaneya Yuddham (1966)
 Pidugu Raamudu (1966)
 Bhulokamlo Yamalokam (1966)
 Prathigna Palana (1966)
 Akasha Ramanna (1965)
 Prameelarjuna Yuddham (1965)
 Aatma Gowravam (1965)
 Vijaya Simha (1965)
 Manushulu Mamathalu (1965)
 Preminchi Chudu (1965)
 Mangamma Sapatham (1965)
 Pakkalo Ballem (1965)
 Babruvahana (1964)
 Aggi Pidugu (1964)
 Totalo Pilla Kotalo Raani (1964)
 Bhaktha Ramadasu (1964)
 Pooja Phalam (1964)
 Bangaru Timmaraju (1964)
 Guruvunu Minchina Sishyudu (1963)
 Madana Kamaraju Katha (1962)
 Conistable Kuthuru (1962)
 Dakshayagnam (1962)
 Aradhana (1962)
 Mahamantri Timmarusu (1962)
 Nitya Kalyanam Paccha Thoranam (1960)
 Sahasra Siracheda Apoorva Chintamani (1960)
 Mangalyam (1960)
 Bhaktha Ambarisha (1959)
 Nagula Chavithi (1956) - Debut in Telugu (Child Artist)

Tamil
This list is incomplete; you can help by expanding it.

Kannada

 Devadhasi (1978)
 Shani Prabhava (1977)
 Naaga Kanye (1975)
 Aashirvaada (1975)
 Mannina Magalu (1974)
 Mahadeshwara Pooja Phala (1974)
 Urvashi (1974)
 CID 72 (1973)
 Jwala Mohini (1973)
 Modala Raathri (1970)
 C.I.D. Rajanna (1970)
 Mr. Rajkumar (1970)
 Sukha Samsaara (1970)
 Bhale Basava (1969)
 Gruhalakshmi (1969)
 Arunodaya (1968)
 Bala Nagamma (1966)
 Naagapooja (1965)
 Satya Harishchandra (1965)
 Chandavalliya Thota (1964)
 Shivagange Mahathme (1964)
 Shivarathri Mahathme (1964)
 Chandra Kumaara (1963)
 Santha Thukaram (1963)
 Kantheredu Nodu (1962)
 Karuneye Kutumbada Kannu (1962)
 Rathna Manjari (1962)
 Swarna Gowri (1962)
 Thejaswini (1962)
 Aasha Sundari (1960)
 Dashavathara (1960) - Kannada debut

Malayalam:credited as Gracy

Hindi

References

External links
 
 Sengamala Theevu
 Magaley Un Samathu
 Yarukku Sondham
 Amma Engey
 Ulagam Ivvalaudhan
 Kallum Kaniyagum
 Pattondru Ketten
 Delhi Mappilai
 Pathu Matha Bandham
 Amudha
 Bama Vijayam
 Kadhalikka Neramillai Song
 Neela Vanam
 Nichaya Thaamboolam
 Kudiyiruntha Kovil
 Poompuhar
 Rajasree & Gemini Ganesan in Madhuraiyil Paranda song – Poova Thalaiya

Actresses in Telugu cinema
Actresses in Tamil cinema
Actresses in Malayalam cinema
Indian film actresses
20th-century Indian actresses
Telugu actresses
Year of birth missing (living people)
Living people
People from West Godavari district
Actresses from Andhra Pradesh
Actresses in Kannada cinema
Actresses in Hindi cinema